Henri Malosse (born 6 October 1954 in Montpellier, France) is a French Politician and representative  of the business world. he has been   the 30th President of the European Economic and Social Committee (EESC) (April 2013 - October 2015).

Biography

Henri Malosse  was born in Montpellier in a family of professors from Corsica. He graduated from the Sciences Po in 1976. 

He began exploring the cultures of Germany, Eastern Europe and speaks Polish, Russian English and German.

Henri Malosse supported strongly the freedom's movement in Poland (Solidarnosc), met Lech Walesa in 1976 in Gdansk and was banned by the polish communist regime of Jaruzelski during 8 years. He has been harassed by the secret police of the polish communist regime. His file can be found in the archivum of IPN in Warsaw. 

He was involved in European policies for SMEs, inspiring the creation of the Euro Info Centres.
He worked to create the Delegation of the Assembly of French Chambers of Commerce and Industry to the European Union, and assumed its Direction six years later.
He also participated in the European Association of Small and Medium Enterprises at the European Parliament.

In 1995 he was appointed by the French government in the European Economic and Social Committee - EESC, the 5th Institution of the European Union, writing more than 50 reports including a critic of the posted workers directive. He was the Chair of the pre-accession EU-Bulgaria Consultative Committee, and of the Employer's Group from 2016 to 2013 - In 2013, He was elected the 30th President of the EESC.

His presidency took attention to the European media thanks to his critical position on EU stand to Greece during the financial crisis . He signed a Protocol of cooperation with Martin Schulz, the President of the European parliament.

He was the first EU representative to participate at Euromaidan in Kiev in December 2013 and to pay a visit to the 14th Dalai Lama in Dharamsala on 10 March 2014. 
His political engagement raised a lot of criticism from the Communist party of China, their supporters in Europe. He was also put temporarily on a blacklist by the Russian federation.

On 15 October 2014, Henri Malosse received the National Order of the Legion of Honour by the former President of the French Republic, Valery Giscard d'Estaing, in Brussels.

Publications
 (with Frederic Fappani von Lothringen) L'Europe c'est quoi pour toi ?, Ed. Harmattan, 2019
 (with Laure Limousin) Building Europe: The History and Future of a Europe of the People /Construction européenne-Histoires et avenir d’une Europe des peuples/ ed L’harmattan, 2012,
 (with Bruno Vever) We must save the European citizen! - A "C plan" to a citizens' Europe /Il faut sauver le citoyen européen ! - Un "plan C" pour rendre l'Europe aux citoyens/, Editions Bruylant , 2010,
 (with Pascal Fontaine) Europe from A to Z /L'Europe de A à Z/, Editions Bruylant , 2006,
 (with Bernard Huchet) Unifying the Greater Europe /Unifier la Grande Europe/, preface by Jean-Pierre Raffarin, postscript by Jacques Santer, Editions Bruylant , 2001,
 Europe at your doorstep: a guide to EU funding mechanisms /L'Europe à votre porte : les instruments de financement et de cooperation/, Paris : Centre français du commerce extérieur, 1991,
 (with Pascal Fontaine) The European Institutions /Les institutions européennes/, Retz, 1992,
 (with Édith Cresson), Europe at your doorstep: practical manual on the actions of the EEC concerning economic operators /L'Europe à votre porte : manuel pratique sur les actions de la CEE intéressant les opérateurs économiques, Paris: Centre français du commerce extérieur, 1989,

References

External links
 EESC | The President

Politicians from Montpellier
French non-fiction writers
Tibet freedom activists
French officials of the European Union
1954 births
Living people
Articles containing video clips